George Kapitan (July 23, 1919 – November 27, 1996) was an American writer for Timely Comics, the 1940s predecessor of Marvel Comics, during the time fans and historians call the Golden Age of Comics. He co-created the medium's first costumed, superpowered female protagonist, the Golden Age Black Widow,  an antiheroine who killed evildoers to deliver their souls to Satan, her master.

Biography
George Kapitan broke into comics in 1940, creating with artist Harry Sahle the early superhero Green Giant (no relation to the advertising icon) in Pelican Publications' Green Giant Comics #1 (1940), produced by Funnies, Inc., a comic book "packager" that produced outsourced comics for publishers testing the waters of the fledgling medium.

Also in 1940, in Mystic Comics #4 (dated Jul. 1940 in postal indicia, cover dated Aug. 1940), he and Sahle created comic books' first costumed, super-powered female character, the original Black Widow, Claire Voyant, an antiheroine who killed evildoers to deliver their souls to Satan, her master.

He is also the unconfirmed, generally accepted co-creator, with Sahle, of the Centaur Publications superhero the Air Man in Keen Detective Funnies #23 (Aug. 1940).

Other work in the early days of the medium includes writing for the Timely character Fiery Mask (and inking at least one Sub-Mariner story); Hillman Periodicals' feature "Private Parker"; Novelty Press' "Dick Cole", "Blue Bolt" and "Target and the Targeteers"; publisher McCombs' humor feature "Master Marvin"; and even Archie Comics' "Archie".

He was living in Panama City, Florida, at the time of his death in 1996, at age 77.

References

1919 births
1996 deaths
American comics writers